HPX, short for High Performance ParalleX, is a runtime system for high-performance computing. It is currently under active development by the STEAR group at Louisiana State University. Focused on scientific computing, it provides an alternative execution model to conventional approaches such as MPI. HPX aims to overcome the challenges MPI faces with increasing large supercomputers by using asynchronous communication between nodes and lightweight control objects instead of global barriers, allowing application developers to exploit fine-grained parallelism.

HPX is developed in idiomatic C++ and released as open source under the Boost Software License, which allows usage in commercial applications.

Applications 
Though designed as a general-purpose environment for high-performance computing, HPX has primarily been used in
 Astrophysics simulation, including the N-body problem, neutron star evolution, and the merging of stars
Octo-Tiger, An astrophysics application simulating the evolution of star systems.
 LibGeoDecomp, A Library for Geometric Decomposition codes
 Simulation crack and fractures utilizing Peridynamics
Phylanx, A Library for Distributed Array Processing

References

External links 
 HPX/STEAR Group Homepage
 Latest HPX Documentation
 HPX GitHub repository
 STEAR Group Blog
 STEAR Group Publications

Parallel computing
C++ libraries